Felipe Beuvrín (born June 14, 1978 in Mérida) is a Venezuelan sport shooter. He competed at the 2000 Summer Olympics, tying for 30th place in the men's 10 metre air pistol and tying for 34th place in the men's 50 metre pistol. Beuvrín started competing in 1991.

References

1978 births
Living people
People from Mérida, Mérida
ISSF pistol shooters
Venezuelan male sport shooters
Olympic shooters of Venezuela
Shooters at the 2000 Summer Olympics
Pan American Games medalists in shooting
Pan American Games gold medalists for Venezuela
Pan American Games silver medalists for Venezuela
Pan American Games bronze medalists for Venezuela
Shooters at the 2015 Pan American Games
Shooters at the 2003 Pan American Games
Shooters at the 2011 Pan American Games
20th-century Venezuelan people
21st-century Venezuelan people